Sysert is a town and the administrative center of Sysertsky District of Sverdlovsk Oblast, Russia, located on the Sysert River (Ob basin, right tributary of the Iset),  south of Yekaterinburg. Population:

History
It was founded in either 1732 or in 1773 and was called Sysertsky Zavod until 1932. Town status was granted to it in 1946.

Administrative and municipal status
Within the framework of administrative divisions, Sysert serves as the administrative center of Sysertsky District and is subordinated to it. As a municipal division, the town of Sysert together with thirty-seven rural localities in Sysertsky District is incorporated as Sysertsky Urban Okrug.

References

Notes

Sources

Cities and towns in Sverdlovsk Oblast
Yekaterinburgsky Uyezd